Frank H. Levinson is an American entrepreneur and investor. Levinson is best known for being co-founder (with Jerry S. Rawls) of Finisar Corporation.

Levinson holds a BS in physics from Butler University, and a PhD in astronomy from the University of Virginia.

Levinson is currently the managing director of the early stage fund and incubator Small World Group, and a partner at the venture capital fund Phoenix Venture Partners.

References

External links
"Frank H Levinson", Forbes
"Frank H Levinson", Forbes Profile
"Frank H Levinson", Stanford University's Entrepreneurship Corner

Living people
Year of birth missing (living people)
Place of birth missing (living people)
University of Virginia alumni